The British Journal of Middle Eastern Studies is a peer-reviewed academic journal published by Routledge on behalf of the British Society for Middle Eastern Studies. It was established in 1974 as the British Society for Middle Eastern Studies. Bulletin, obtaining its current title in 1991.

Abstracting and indexing
The journal is abstracted and indexed in:

According to the Journal Citation Reports, the journal has a 2019 impact factor of 0.857.

References

External links

Middle Eastern studies journals
5 times per year journals
Publications established in 1974
English-language journals
Routledge academic journals